AMD Eyefinity is a brand name for AMD video card products that support multi-monitor setups by integrating multiple (up to six) display controllers on one GPU. AMD Eyefinity was introduced with the Radeon HD 5000 Series "Evergreen" in September 2009 and has been available on APUs and professional-grade graphics cards branded AMD FirePro as well.

AMD Eyefinity supports a maximum of 2 non-DisplayPort displays (e.g., HDMI, DVI, VGA, DMS-59, VHDCI) (which AMD calls "legacy output") and up to 6 DisplayPort displays simultaneously using a single graphics card or APU. To feed more than two displays, the additional panels must have native DisplayPort support. Alternatively active DisplayPort-to-DVI/HDMI/VGA adapters can be employed.

The setup of large video walls by connecting multiple computers over Gigabit Ethernet or Ethernet is also supported.

The version of AMD Eyefinity (aka DCE, display controller engine) introduced with Excavator-based Carrizo APUs features a Video underlay pipe.

Overview
AMD Eyefinity is implemented by multiple on-die display controllers. The HD 5000-series designs host two internal clocks and one external clock. Displays connected over VGA, DVI, or HDMI each require their own internal clock. But all displays connected over DisplayPort can be driven from only one external clock. This external clock is what allows Eyefinity to fuel up to six monitors from a single card.

The entire HD 5000 series of products have Eyefinity capabilities supporting three outputs.  The Radeon HD 5870 Eyefinity Edition, however, supports six mini DisplayPort outputs, all of which can be simultaneously active.

The display controller has two RAMDACs  that drive the VGA or  DVI ports in analog mode. For example, when a DVI-to-VGA converter is attached to a DVI port). It also has a maximum of six digital transmitters that can output either a DisplayPort signal or a TMDS signal for either DVI or HDMI, and two clock signal generators to drive the digital outputs in TMDS mode. Dual-link DVI displays use two of the TMDS/DisplayPort transmitters and one clock signal each. Single-link DVI displays and HDMI displays use one TMDS/DisplayPort transmitter and one clock signal each. DisplayPort displays use one TMDS/DisplayPort transmitter and no clock signal.

An active DisplayPort adapter can convert a DisplayPort signal to another type of signal—like VGA, single-link DVI, or dual-link DVI; or HDMI if more than two non-DisplayPort displays must be connected to a Radeon HD 5000 series graphics card.

DisplayPort 1.2 added the possibility to drive multiple displays on single DisplayPort connector, called Multi-Stream Transport (MST). AMD graphics solutions equipped with DisplayPort 1.2 outputs can run multiple monitors from a single port.

At High-Performance Graphics 2010 Mark Fowler presented the Evergreen and stated that e.g. 5870 (Cypress), 5770 (Juniper) and 5670 (Redwood) support max resolution of the 6 times 2560×1600 pixels, while the 5470 (Cedar) supports 4 times 2560×1600 pixels.

Availability

Feature overview for AMD graphics cards 

All AMD GPUs starting with the Evergreen series support a maximum of 2 non-DisplayPort displays and a maximum of 6 DisplayPort displays per graphics card.

Feature overview for AMD APUs 

AMD Eyefinity is also available in AMD's APU branded product line. The A10-7850K is said to support up to four displays.

Software support 

AMD Catalyst supports Eyefinity and enables the user to independently configure and run each attached displays. It facilitates the configuration of "cloned mode", i.e. to copy one desktop onto multiple screens or "extended mode", i.e. to span the workspace across multiple screens and combine the resolutions of all of those displays into one big resolution. AMD calls the extended modes Single Large Surface (SLS) and Catalyst support of certain range of display group configurations. For example, 5x1 landscape and 5x1 portrait are supported since AMD Catalyst version 11.10 from October 2011.

Starting in Catalyst 14.6, AMD supports mixed resolution support, so a single Eyefinity display group can drive each monitor at a different resolution. This is provided through two new Eyefinity display modes, Fit and Expand, in addition to the existing Fill mode. In Fit or Expand mode, AMD compensates for mismatched resolutions by creating a virtual desktop of a different resolution than the monitors, and then either padding it out or cropping it as is necessary.

AMD Eyefinity works with games that support non-standard aspect ratios, which is required for panning across multiple displays. SLS ("Single Large Surface") mode requires an identical display resolution on all configured displays. AMD validated some video games to support Eyefinity. The short list includes titles such as Age of Conan, ARMA 2: Operation Arrowhead, S.T.A.L.K.E.R.: Call of Pripyat, Serious Sam 3: BFE, Singularity (video game), Sleeping Dogs, Assassin's Creed II, Sniper Elite V2, Soldier of Fortune Online, Tom Clancy's Splinter Cell: Conviction, Star Wars: The Force Unleashed 2, Marvel Super Hero Squad Online, R.U.S.E., Supreme Commander 2 among others. However, some games not on this short list seem to work as well, e.g. Dirt 3 and The Elder Scrolls V: Skyrim.

KMS driver supports AMD Eyefinity.

See also 

 AMD FireMV – pre-Eyefinity products for multi-monitor set-ups
 Multi-monitor

References

External links
  playing The Elder Scrolls V: Skyrim

AMD IP cores
Multi-monitor